Oeceoclades lavergneae is a terrestrial orchid species in the genus Oeceoclades that is endemic to Réunion in the Indian Ocean. It was first described by French orchid enthusiast and collector Jean-Bernard Castillon in 2012. The type specimen was collected from the forests on the western cliffs of the island along the Rivière des Galets at about  elevation.

References

lavergneae
Endemic flora of Réunion
Plants described in 2012